The Time Commander is the name of two DC Comics supervillains. The first appeared in Brave and the Bold #59 (April–May 1965).  He was created by Bob Haney and Ramona Fradon. The second appeared in JSA Classified #34 (2008). He most recently appeared in Super Sons #7 following DC's Rebirth of its titles.

Fictional character biography
John Starr was a brilliant scientist who turned to crime after the demise of the artificial humanoid project which employed him. He was soon imprisoned, and while incarcerated perfected the Hourglass, which harnessed electricity and gave control over time itself.

Calling himself the Time Commander, the "Modern Monte Cristo", Starr’s criminal career focused on rewriting his past: making himself appear "railroaded" into prison and killing his former employer. These early schemes were foiled by Batman and Green Lantern.

Years later, Starr’s agenda then took a turn for the grandiose, as he began resurrecting the dead by reversing time's flow, with the goal of returning humanity literally to the Eden. Elongated Man, Metamorpho and Rocket Red join up with Animal Man and they track down Time Commander. It is revealed, however, that Starr is reversing time in positive ways, such as granting one woman youth and bringing back a dead man. Regardless, Time Commander swiftly defeats most of them, even destroying Rocket Red's armor. Animal Man notices the positive effects but is not sure if it is a good idea in the long run. Time Commander notes he is making life more interesting in general, furthermore that Animal Man doesn't seem like a bad person, just that Starr doesn't want any more psychiatric help. Metamorpho, recovered, smashes Time Commander's hourglass and knocks Starr out with one punch, not noticing that his positive time reversals are now no more.

Starr is freed from prison by the Calendar Man with the intent to join with the Clock King and Chronos as the Time Foes. The villains aimed to recover Starr's hourglass, but were confronted by the Team Titans. Calendar Man asks Starr to use his hourglass in battle. He claims he cannot do it, as it is an instrument for good (despite him having used it to smack around the heroine Redwing moments earlier) and also, the hourglass is broken. Starr is not seen actually fighting in the resulting battle, but he is admonished later by his captured allies for just having surrendered. Starr explains he is misunderstood, at heart he is a peaceful man.

After an encounter later with Epoch, the Time Foes become stuck in a temporal loop (as a result of the dawning moments of Zero Hour affecting reality). Unable to free himself or his teammates, John Starr seemed doomed to perish there, although they somehow escape later, as the Foes were later seen in other stories post-Zero Hour.

Death
Years later, in a reality affected by two time crises (Zero Hour and Infinite Crisis) since the Time Foes were last seen, Waverider is in a clock store when time freezes. Time Commander appears inside of an hourglass and berates Waverider for his failed promises to make Starr, Chronos and other villains Time Masters in exchange for joining his fight. Starr then dissolves into sand, killed by Skeets, the robot ally to the time-travelling Booster Gold (who is, in fact, a disguised and time-travelling Mister Mind); Waverider is swiftly killed as well.

Successor
Sterling Fry took up the Time Commander name after his mentor, John Starr, was killed. He kidnapped Liberty Belle in an attempt to steal Hourman's hourglass. Time Commander beat Hourman and took the hourglass from him. After releasing the tachyon particles from the hourglass, Fry disappeared. Whether his exposure to the particles killed him or not is not known at this time.

Soon after, Time Commander encounters the Justice League, who have been scattered through time by Epoch, and helps them. Although he appears to be acting as a hero, it transpires that in addition to acquiring Epoch's time displacement gauntlet, he also recovered the original Time Commander's hourglass from the JLA trophy room. It is not made clear if this Time Commander is Sterling Fry or a new character, or even (thanks to time travel) John Starr himself.

DC Rebirth
In "DC Rebirth", he is shown for the first time in Super Sons #7 as an artificial forgotten villain created by an elderly magician named Kraklow using a mysterious clay given to him by a future/multiversal version of himself.

Powers and abilities
The Time Commander’s hourglass allows him to control time, allowing him to travel through time, move objects or beings through time and manipulate time in various ways.

Other versions
 The Time Commander appears in Justice League Unlimited #19, where he attempts to kill the ancestor of Vigilante.
 An Elseworlds version of Time Commander appears in a flashback in JLA: Another Nail. This version led a team called "The Warpists", which consisted of Calendar Man, Amazo and Starfire.

References

External links
 http://www.dcuguide.com/who.php?name=timecommander

DC Comics supervillains
Comics characters introduced in 1965
Characters created by Bob Haney